Paulianomyia is a genus of horse flies in the family Tabanidae.

Distribution
Madagascar.

Species
Paulianomyia rufa Oldroyd, 1957

References

Brachycera genera
Tabanidae
Diptera of Africa
Endemic fauna of Madagascar
Taxa named by Harold Oldroyd